Thamnosophis infrasignatus, commonly known as the forest water snake, is a species of snake in the family Pseudoxyrhophiidae. It is endemic to Madagascar.

References 

Pseudoxyrhophiidae
Snakes of Africa
Reptiles of Madagascar
Endemic fauna of Madagascar
Reptiles described in 1882
Taxa named by Albert Günther